Volgasuchus was found in 1940; it was considered a Capitosauridae according to R. L. Carroll in 1988. There is little to no information on this amphibian. In 2020 Volgasaurus was found to be a junior synonym of Wetlugasaurus.

References

Capitosaurs